Marcelo Hugo Herrera (born October 5, 1966 in San Salvador de Jujuy), nicknamed Popeye, is a retired Argentine football midfielder. He usually played on the right wing. He was part of Vélez Sársfield successful 1990s era, winning 2 domestic and 3 international championships with the club. He is currently the manager of Gimnasia Jujuy.

Playing career
Herrera started playing professionally for Salta's club Gimnasia y Tiro in 1992. He was bought by Vélez Sársfield in 1994 and was part of the first team in the club's history to obtain two championships in a row, the Apertura and Clausura of the 1995-96 season. He was Vélez top-scorer on that Clausura tournament, along Patricio Camps, with 7 goals each.

His only playing experience outside Argentina was a 6-month period at MLS' Miami Fusion. He retired in 2001, playing for his hometown club Gimnasia de Jujuy.

Coaching career
In 2007, Herrera worked as an assistant manager for Hugo Tocalli in Vélez Sársfield. One year later, he was signed as manager of LD Alajuelense in the Costa Rican Primera División.
In 2013, Herrera works as an assistant manager for Carlos Bianchi in Boca Juniors.

Honours
Vélez Sársfield
Primera División Argentina (2): 1995 Apertura, 1996 Clausura
Intercontinental Cup (1): 1994
Supercopa Sudamericana (1): 1996
Recopa Sudamericana (1): 1997

References

External links
  Marcelo Herrera – Argentine Primera statistics at Fútbol XXI  
 
 
 Marcelo Herrera at Footballdatabase

1966 births
Living people
Sportspeople from Jujuy Province
Argentine footballers
Association football midfielders
Club Atlético Vélez Sarsfield footballers
Gimnasia y Esgrima de Jujuy footballers
Club Atlético Belgrano footballers
Club Atlético Platense footballers
Miami Fusion players
Argentine Primera División players
Argentine expatriate footballers
Argentine expatriate sportspeople in the United States
Expatriate soccer players in the United States
Major League Soccer players
Argentine football managers
L.D. Alajuelense managers
Club Real Potosí managers
Expatriate football managers in Costa Rica